Heart of a Hero may refer to:

 Heart of a Hero, a Chance Thomas score in The Lord of the Rings Online
 Heart of a Hero, a Luther Vandross score in Hero
 Heart of a Hero, a 1994 TV documentary about Canine Companions for Independence
 Heart of a Hero, a theme song in Disney Junior
 Heart of a Hero, a song by Club Danger
 Heart of a Hero, a song by Cathy Heller
 Heart of a Hero, a consumable item in Conan Exiles
 Heart of a Hero, a novel series by Laura Trentham
 The Heart of a Hero, a 1916 silent film
 The Heart of a Hero, a novel by Susan May Warren
 The Heart of a Hero, a 2013 autobiography by Clarence Singleton
 Dex: The Heart of a Hero, a 2007 book by Caralyn Buehner